Adelin Shiva Pîrcălabu (born 1 May 1996) is a Romanian professional footballer who plays as a midfielder for Viitorul Târgu Jiu.

Honours
FC Voluntari
Supercupa României: 2017

References

External links
 
 

1996 births
Living people
Romanian footballers
Association football midfielders
Liga I players
Liga II players
CS Pandurii Târgu Jiu players
FC Voluntari players
FC Gloria Buzău players
ACS Viitorul Târgu Jiu players
Sportspeople from Târgu Jiu